Garden of the Phoenix is a Japanese garden on the grounds of Jackson Park in Chicago. Originally created in 1893, its current name dates to 2013.

History

Jackson Park's Japanese gardens were originally created during the 1893 World's Columbian Exposition, with a garden and a Japanese Ho-O Den (Phoenix Temple) for the government of Japan as a pavilion for the exposition. The pavilion was based on the Hō-Ō-Dō (鳳凰堂 "Phoenix Hall") of the Byōdō Temple (平等院, "Temple of Equality")  in Kyoto. The phoenix emblem was a reference to Chicago rising like the mythical firebird from the ashes of the Great Chicago Fire of 1871. After the 1893 Fair, most of the Fair structures were burned or torn down, but the garden and the Ho-O Den Pavilion remained intact.

In 1933 the government of Japan constructed a traditional tea house at the Century of Progress World's Fair and also created a garden on Wooded Island's northeast side and refurbished the Ho-O Den. After WWII the pavilion and tea house were destroyed by fire and the garden was abandoned. After the city of Osaka became one of Chicago's sister cities, one the goals of the Sister Cities program became to revive the Japanese Garden in Jackson Park.  With the collective efforts of the City of Osaka and the Chicago Park District, the gardens were restored and named "Osaka Garden" in 1993 in honor of that city's help and friendship. The gardens were renamed Garden of the Phoenix in 2013.

Features
There is a koi pond within the garden.  The stones within the park carry an old legend which says they are laid in a zigzag because evil spirits can only move in a straight line, so if you cross the stones, any evil spirits will just fall into the water.

The Kasuga Lantern is one of the lamps that survived from 1893. It takes its name from the Kasuga Shrine in Nara, Japan. The deer panel is one of the four traditional symbols, the others were a stag, the sun, and the moon, most of which are damaged.

The garden holds American plantings, but it also holds unique Japanese plants, usually found only in Japan. The theme of the garden  is peace. It holds a harmony of the peace and balance possible between countries and cultures, between nature and city. Its wandering, stone pathways are designed to encourage a sense of peace around and within its visitors. The garden is meant to resemble natural scenery but at a small scale, with representation of mountains, islands and lakes. The garden is intended to provide a tranquil space for meditation.

Gallery

See also
Shofuso Japanese House and Garden
Portland Japanese Garden
Japanese Tea Garden of San Francisco
Hammond Museum and Japanese Stroll Garden
Roji-en Japanese Gardens

References

External links

 Garden of the Phoenix 
 Jackson Park official site

Parks in Chicago
South Side, Chicago
Japanese gardens in the United States
Urban public parks
World's Columbian Exposition
World's fair sites in Illinois